Nya Jerome Kirby (born 31 January 2000) is an English professional footballer who plays as a midfielder, most recently for Crystal Palace.

Club career
Kirby played youth football for Tottenham Hotspur and Crystal Palace, before moving on loan to Blackpool in January 2019.

He made his debut for Blackpool on 29 January 2019, coming off the bench in a 2–2 draw with Wycombe Wanderers and winning the 85th minute penalty which Harry Pritchard scored to earn a point.

Kirby made his senior debut for Crystal Palace on 15 September 2020 against AFC Bournemouth in the second round of the EFL Cup.

On 22 January 2021, Kirby joined League Two club Tranmere Rovers on loan for the remainder of the 2020–21 season.

Kirby was released by Crystal Palace at the end of the 2021–22 season.

International career
He has represented England at under-17, under-18 and under-19 international youth levels.

He was a member of the team that won the 2017 FIFA U-17 World Cup, scoring the decisive penalty in the round of 16 against Japan and was a second-half substitute against Spain in the final. Kirby also represented England under-19 at the 2018 UEFA European Under-19 Championship.

Career statistics

Honours
Tranmere Rovers
EFL Trophy runner-up: 2020–21

England U17 
FIFA U-17 World Cup: 2017

References

2000 births
Living people
People from the London Borough of Islington
English footballers
England youth international footballers
Association football midfielders
Tottenham Hotspur F.C. players
Crystal Palace F.C. players
Blackpool F.C. players
Tranmere Rovers F.C. players
English Football League players